Mario Majoni (27 May 1910 – 16 August 1985) was an Italian water polo player who competed in the 1948 Summer Olympics.

He was part of the Italian team which won the gold medal. He played three matches.
His name is often spelled Maioni, but most Italian sources spell it with a j.

See also
 Italy men's Olympic water polo team records and statistics
 List of Olympic champions in men's water polo
 List of Olympic medalists in water polo (men)
 List of members of the International Swimming Hall of Fame

References

External links
 

1910 births
1985 deaths
Italian male water polo players
Water polo players at the 1948 Summer Olympics
Olympic gold medalists for Italy in water polo
Medalists at the 1948 Summer Olympics
Water polo players from Genoa